Monte Grimano Terme is a comune (municipality) in the Province of Pesaro e Urbino in the Italian region Marche, located about  northwest of Ancona and about  west of Pesaro. Until 2002, it was known as Monte Grimano.

Monte Grimaro Terme borders the following municipalities: Fiorentino, Macerata Feltria, Mercatino Conca, Monte Cerignone, Montecopiolo, Montegiardino, San Leo, Sassofeltrio.

References

Cities and towns in the Marche